The following is a list of notable deaths in December 2019.

Entries for each day are listed alphabetically by surname. A typical entry lists information in the following sequence:
 Name, age, country of citizenship at birth, subsequent country of citizenship (if applicable), reason for notability, cause of death (if known), and reference.

December 2019

1
Henri Biancheri, 87, French football player (Monaco, Angers) and executive (Monaco).
Shyamal Kanti Biswas, 71, Bangladeshi academic, vice-chancellor of Chittagong University of Engineering and Technology (2007–2012).
Noksong Boham, 71, Indian politician, MLA (1978–1980, 1984–1999), cancer.
Miguelina Cobián, 77, Cuban sprinter, Olympic silver medalist (1968).
Anthony Cooke, 92, British rear admiral.
Edgardo Gomez, 81, Filipino biologist.
Miguel Hesayne, 96, Argentinian Roman Catholic prelate, Bishop of Viedma (1975–1995).
Mariss Jansons, 76, Latvian conductor, heart disease.
Robert M. Koerner, 85, American engineer and academic.
Michael Lai, 73, Hong Kong Cantopop composer (Police Story, Project A Part II, Miracles) and actor.
Lil Bub, 8, American celebrity cat (Lil Bub & Friendz).
Liu Gangji, 86, Chinese philosopher, aesthetician, historian, and artist.
Shelley Morrison, 83, American actress (Will & Grace, The Flying Nun, General Hospital), heart failure.
René Rebuffat, 89, French historian and archeologist.
Sacred Falls, 10, New Zealand racehorse and sire, liver disease.
Paul Sirba, 59, American Roman Catholic prelate, Bishop of Duluth (since 2009), heart attack.
Pat Sullivan, 69, American Hall of Fame football player (Auburn Tigers, Atlanta Falcons, Washington Redskins) and coach, Heisman Trophy winner (1971), cancer.
Paula Tilbrook, 89, English actress (Emmerdale, Last of the Summer Wine).

2
George Atkinson III, 27, American football player (Oakland Raiders, Cleveland Browns).
Nicolas Bokov, 74, Russian writer.
Jimmy Cavallo, 92, American musician, heart failure.
Richard Easton, 86, Canadian actor (The Brothers, Henry V, Revolutionary Road), Tony winner (2001).
D. C. Fontana, 80, American television writer (Star Trek, The Streets of San Francisco, The Waltons).
William D. Haseman, 71, American computer scientist.
Francesco Janich, 82, Italian footballer (Lazio, Bologna, national team).
Sir John Kerr, 82, British admiral, Chief of Defence Intelligence (1988–1991), Commander-in-Chief Naval Home Command (1991–1993).
Robert K. Massie, 90, American Romanov historian, Pulitzer Prize winner (1981).
Johann Baptist Metz, 91, German theologian.
Jacques Morgantini, 95, French record producer and promoter.
Carl Muller, 84, Sri Lankan poet and writer.
Alfred Reid, 81, Jamaican Anglican prelate, Bishop of Jamaica (2000–2012).
Mutaib bin Abdulaziz Al Saud, 88, Saudi royal, Governor of Makkah Region (1958–1961).
Manfred Schneckenburger, 81, German art historian and curator, director of the documenta art exhibition (1977, 1987).
Greedy Smith, 63, Australian musician (Mental As Anything), heart attack.
Joe Smith, 91, American music industry executive (Capitol Records, Elektra Records, Warner Records).
Fred Storey, 87, Canadian curler.
Kenneth Allen Taylor, 65, American philosopher and radio host, heart attack.
Juan Pablo Vergara, 34, Peruvian footballer (Binacional, UTC), traffic collision.
Francette Vernillat, 82, French actress (Thérèse Raquin).
Bhagwati Singh Visharad, 98, Indian politician, MLA (1957–1962, 1967–1977, 1980–1989, 1991–1993).
Vini Vitharana, 91, Sri Lankan linguist and professor.
Zhang Zhenxian, 92, Chinese air force general, Political Commissar of the Jinan and Guangzhou Military Region Air Forces.

3
Rawshan Ara Bachchu, 86, Bangladeshi activist.
Arthur Baysting, 72, New Zealand writer, musician, and children's advocate.
Giovanni Bertini, 68, Italian footballer (Roma, Fiorentina, Catania), amyotrophic lateral sclerosis.
Cha In-ha, 27, South Korean actor.
Mary Craig, 91, British journalist and writer.
André Daguin, 84, French chef, cancer.
Jean Deloche, 90, French historian.
Johann Eyfells, 96, Icelandic artist.
Fang Zengxian, 88, Chinese painter, Director of the Shanghai Art Museum, founder of the Shanghai Biennale.
Firoz Ghanty, 67, Mauritian painter, poet, and activist. 
Nosrat Karimi, 94, Iranian actor and filmmaker.
Shaaban Abdel Rahim, 62, Egyptian shaabi singer, heart failure.
R. Ramanathan, 71, Indian politician, MLA (1985–1991), cardiac arrest.
Donald Tosh, 84, British screenwriter (Doctor Who).
Ragnar Ulstein, 99, Norwegian journalist and resistance fighter.
Andrew Weiner, 70, Canadian science fiction author.

4
Javier Aguirre, 84, Spanish film director (Count Dracula's Great Love).
Cas Banaszek, 74, American football player (San Francisco 49ers).
Chen Xingbi, 88, Chinese electronics engineer, inventor of the superjunction power semiconductor device.
Thomas Elsaesser, 76, German film historian.
Leonard Goldberg, 85, American film and television producer (Charlie's Angels, Blue Bloods, WarGames), president of 20th Century Fox (1987–1989), injuries from a fall.
Julius Gould, 95, British sociologist.
Azucena Hernández, 59, Spanish actress (El Retorno del Hombre Lobo).
Helen Kimble, 94, British Africanist.
Ján Eugen Kočiš, 93, Slovak-born Czech Ruthenian Greek Catholic hierarch, Auxiliary Bishop of Apostolic Exarchate of Czech Republic (2004–2006).
Charles Daniel Marivate, 95, South African physician.
Sheila Mercier, 100, English actress (Emmerdale).
Rosa Morena, 78, Spanish flamenco pop singer and actress, cancer.
Margaret Morgan Lawrence, 105, American psychiatrist and psychoanalyst.
Tetsu Nakamura, 73, Japanese physician, shot.
Ockie Oosthuizen, 64, South African rugby union player (national team), cancer.
Patrick Pym, 83, British Olympic sailor (1972).
Claudio Rodríguez, 86, Spanish voice actor.
C. O. Simpkins Sr., 94, American dentist, civil rights activist, and politician, member of the Louisiana House of Representatives (1992–1996).
Michel Verhoeve, 80, French Olympic footballer (1968).
Peter van Walsum, 85, Dutch diplomat.
Bob Willis, 70, English cricketer (Surrey, Warwickshire, national team), prostate cancer.
Ranjith de Zoysa, 57, Sri Lankan politician, MP (since 2010).

5
Pietro Brollo, 86, Italian Roman Catholic prelate, Bishop of Belluno-Feltre (1996–2000) and Archbishop of Udine (2000–2009).
Rick Bryant, 71, New Zealand blues and rock musician (Rick Bryant and the Jive Bombers, The Windy City Strugglers).
Faure Chomón, 90, Cuban guerrillero (Directorio Revolucionario Estudiantil, 26th of July Movement), diplomat and politician, MP (since 1976).
Leon Cole, 79, Canadian musician and radio presenter.
Jon Comer, 43, American skateboarder, kidney and liver failure.
Gérard Detourbet, 73, French automotive executive and engineer (Renault), cancer.
Lidija Franklin, 102, American dancer and teacher.
Gao Yubao, 92, Chinese writer.
Marvin Goodfriend, 69, American economist.
Sherman Howard, 95, American football player (Cleveland Browns).
Don Howell, 84, Australian footballer (St Kilda, Collingwood).
Ji Zhe, 33, Chinese basketball player (Beijing Ducks), lung cancer.
Mors Kochanski, 79, Polish-Canadian wilderness survival instructor and writer.
George Laurer, 94, American inventor (Universal Product Code).
Jerry Naylor, 80, American musician (The Crickets).
Bruno Scipioni, 85, Italian actor (La ragazza di Bube, Love Italian Style, The Pizza Triangle).
Natalie Trundy, 79, American actress (The Careless Years, Mr. Hobbs Takes a Vacation, Conquest of the Planet of the Apes).
Robert Walker Jr., 79, American actor (Ensign Pulver, The Ceremony, Star Trek).

6
Yevda Abramov, 71, Azerbaijani politician, Deputy (since 2005).
V. Balasundaram, 77, Indian politician, Mayor of Chennai (1969–1970).
Janusz Dzięcioł, 65, Polish reality show winner (Big Brother) and politician, MP (2007–2015), traffic collision.
John L. Harmer, 85, American politician and writer, member of the California State Senate (1966–1974) and Lieutenant Governor of California (1974–1975).
Joan Hawes, 86, English cricketer.
Iqbal Hossain, 69, Bangladeshi politician, MP (1988–1990).
Piet Huyg, 68, Dutch footballer (HFC Haarlem).
Mahfuzur Rahman Khan, 70, Bangladeshi cinematographer (Srabon Megher Din, Dui Duari, Hajar Bachhor Dhore).
Irena Laskowska, 94, Polish actress (The Last Day of Summer, Salto, Everything for Sale).
Ron Leibman, 82, American actor (Angels in America, Norma Rae, Kaz), Tony winner (1993), complications from pneumonia.
Kimmi Lewis, 62, American politician, member of the Colorado House of Representatives (since 2017), breast cancer.
Lu Shixin, 89, Chinese cancer pathologist, member of the Chinese Academy of Sciences.
Donald B. Marron Sr., 85, American financier, heart attack.
Maurice Mounsdon, 101, British WWII RAF pilot.
Stoyanka Mutafova, 97, Bulgarian actress (The Tied Up Balloon, Toplo, Whale).
Michael Peacock, 90, British television executive, cancer.
Mario Sossi, 87, Italian magistrate and politician.
Brian Sparrow, 57, English footballer (Crystal Palace).
Jo Ann Washam, 69, American golfer.
Wei Xinghua, 94, Chinese economist.

7
Gerald Barrax, 86, American poet and professor (North Carolina State University), traffic collision.
Berkley Bedell, 98, American politician and businessman, member of the U.S. House of Representatives (1975–1987) and founder of Berkley, complications from a stroke.
Norman Berson, 93, American politician, member of the Pennsylvania House of Representatives (1967–1982).
Reinhard Bonnke, 79, German Pentecostal evangelist.
Lisa de Cazotte, 58, American soap opera producer (Sunset Beach, The Young and the Restless, Days of Our Lives).
Denise D'Ascenzo, 61, American news anchor (WFSB), heart attack.
Charles Koffi Diby, 62, Ivorian politician.
Bump Elliott, 94, American Hall of Fame college football player (Purdue Boilermakers), coach (Michigan Wolverines, Iowa Hawkeyes) and administrator.
Kate Figes, 62, English author, cancer.
Giuseppe Frigo, 84, Italian jurist, Magistrate of the Constitutional Court (2008–2016).
Max van Gelder, 95, Dutch Olympic water polo player (1952), and European Champion (1950).
Herbert Joos, 79, German jazz trumpeter.
Jerry Jumonville, 78, American saxophonist and arranger.
Philip King, 94, American historian.
Denis Lalanne, 93, French sports journalist.
Bertrand Landrieu, 74, French politician and prefect.
Joe McQueen, 100, American jazz saxophonist.
Georges Mouly, 88, French politician, Mayor of Tulle (1974–1977) and Saint-Priest-de-Gimel (1989–2001).
Ali Mufuruki, 60, Tanzanian businessman, Chairman of Vodacom Tanzania (since 2017).
Walter Pauk, 105, American educationist and author (Cornell Notes).
Ron Saunders, 87, English football player (Portsmouth) and manager (Aston Villa, Birmingham City).
Simon Streatfeild, 90, British-Canadian conductor and violist.
Zaza Urushadze, 53, Georgian film director (Tangerines), heart attack.
Samuel Vigil, 90, American politician.
Wolfgang Winkler, 76, German actor (The Rabbit Is Me, Das Mädchen auf dem Brett, I Was Nineteen).

8
Suresh Gundu Amonkar, 84, Indian educationist.
René Auberjonois, 79, American actor (Star Trek: Deep Space Nine, M*A*S*H, Benson), Tony winner (1970), assisted suicide.
Weldon Bowlin, 78, American baseball player (Kansas City Athletics).
Anna Bravo, 81, Italian social and feminism historian.
Roy Cheetham, 79, English footballer (Manchester City).
Doyle Corman, 87, American politician, member of the Pennsylvania Senate (1978–1998).
Paddy Guinane, 80, Australian footballer (Richmond).
Wilhelm Helms, 95, German politician, MP, 1969–1972, MEP (1979–1984).
Juice Wrld, 21, American rapper ("All Girls Are the Same", "Lucid Dreams", "Bandit"), seizure following drug overdose.
Hirokazu Kanazawa, 88, Japanese karateka and teacher.
Jerry Karr, 83, American politician, member of the Kansas Senate (1981–1999).
Dick Kraus, 82, American politician, member of the Massachusetts Senate (1983–1991), Parkinson's disease.
Bhagabat Prasad Mohanty, 90, Indian politician, MLA (1971–1974, 1985–1990, 1995–2000).
Rogério Pipi, 97, Portuguese footballer (Benfica, Botafogo, national team).
Herbert Pundik, 92, Danish-Israeli journalist.
Caroll Spinney, 85, American puppeteer (Sesame Street), cartoonist and author.
Tessa Temata, 52, New Zealand diplomat, High Commissioner to the Cook Islands (since 2019).
Paul Volcker, 92, American economist, Chair of the Federal Reserve (1979–1987).
Zvonimir Vujin, 76, Serbian-Yugoslavian Olympic bronze medallist amateur boxer (1968, 1972).

9
Tom Adams, 93, American-born Scottish illustrator.
John R. Broxson, 87, American politician, member of the Florida Senate (1967–1971).
Francisco Estrada, 71, Mexican baseball player and manager (New York Mets, Mexican League).
Marie Fredriksson, 61, Swedish singer-songwriter (Roxette) and musician, complications from a brain tumour.
Omar Graffigna, 93, Argentine Air Force officer, convicted criminal and military junta member.
Leon Hardeman, 87, American football player (Georgia Tech Yellow Jackets).
Chuck Heberling, 94, American basketball and football referee (NFL) and administrator, director of the Western Pennsylvania Interscholastic Athletic League (1976–1997).
Masashi Ishibashi, 95, Japanese politician.
Kim Woo-choong, 82, South Korean businessman, founder of Daewoo, pneumonia.
William Luce, 88, American playwright (The Belle of Amherst, Barrymore).
June Nash, 92, American anthropologist.
Pedro Nikken, 74, Venezuelan lawyer and jurist, president of the Inter-American Court of Human Rights (1983–1986).
Patrice Ordas, 68, French writer.
Miko Palanca, 41, Filipino actor (Tabing Ilog, Panday, Palos), suicide by jumping.
Rosselle Pekelis, 81, American judge (Washington Supreme Court), brain cancer.
Veijo Puhjo, 71, Finnish politician, MP (1995–2011).
Detlef Pirsig, 74, German football player and manager (MSV Duisburg).
José Mauro Ramalho, 94, Brazilian Roman Catholic prelate, Bishop of Iguatu (1962–2000).
Zoran Rankić, 84, Serbian actor.
Ajoy Roy, 84, Bangladeshi physicist and human rights activist.
Gandharv Singh, 87, Indian politician, MLA (1990–1993).
May Stevens, 95, American artist and political activist.
Elizabeth Sutherland, 24th Countess of Sutherland, 98, Scottish noblewoman, chief of Clan Sutherland.
Ben Turok, 92, South African anti-apartheid activist and politician, member of the National Assembly.
Imre Varga, 96, Hungarian sculptor and painter.

10
Md. Abdul Kadir, Bangladeshi politician.
Albert Bertelsen, 98, Danish painter.
Rajen Borthakur, 54, Indian politician, MLA (since 2019), kidney disease.
Frederick B. Dent, 97, American businessman, Secretary of Commerce (1973–1975).
Natalie Harrowell, 29, English rugby league player (Featherstone Rovers, national team).
Barrie Keeffe, 74, English screenwriter (The Long Good Friday).
Gershon Kingsley, 97, German-American composer and electronic musician ("Popcorn").
Yury Luzhkov, 83, Russian politician, Mayor of Moscow (1992–2010), complications during heart surgery.
Emily Mason, 87, American painter.
Paul Anthony McDermott, 47, Irish prosecutor.
Philip McKeon, 55, American actor (Alice).
Lawrence Middleton, 89, British diplomat, Ambassador to South Korea (1986–1990).
Thabiso Mokhosi, 51, South African army chief (since 2019).
Notnowcato, 17, British Thoroughbred racehorse, heart attack. (death announced on this date)
Jean Pagé, 73, Canadian sportscaster and journalist (La Soirée du hockey), complications from prostate cancer.
Adam Słodowy, 96, Polish investor and television host.
Jim Smith, 79, English football player (Boston United) and manager (Portsmouth, Derby County).
Randy Suess, 74, American computer programmer.
Ashok Kalyanrao Tapkir, 70, Indian politician, MLA (1985–1990).
Lily Thomas, 92, Indian constitutional lawyer.
Scott Timberg, 50, American journalist and culture writer (Los Angeles Times, Salon, The Hollywood Reporter), suicide.
Fabio Vásquez Castaño, 79, Colombian rebel, co-founder of National Liberation Army.
Bill Welsh, 95, Australian footballer (Collingwood).

11
David Bellamy, 86, English naturalist (Bellamy's Backyard Safari) and author.
Paul Crossley, 74, British art historian.
Takeo Daigo, 81, Japanese baseball player (Orions), acute myeloid leukemia.
Nicole de Buron, 90, French writer.
Sir John Graham, 4th Baronet, 93, British diplomat, ambassador to Iraq (1974–1977), Iran (1979–1980) and NATO (1982–1986).
Larry Heinemann, 75, American writer.
Jiří Jirmal, 94, Czech classical guitarist.
Guy Laporte, 71, French actor (French Fried Vacation, French Fried Vacation 2), Charcot–Marie–Tooth disease.
Ted Lepcio, 90, American baseball player (Boston Red Sox).
Mike Lindsay, 81, British Olympic track and field athlete (1960, 1964).
Tessa Majors, 18, American student, stabbed.
Anna Manel·la, 69, Spanish sculptor.
James McCarthy, 75, American oceanographer.
William S. McFeely, 89, American historian, Pulitzer Prize recipient (1982), idiopathic pulmonary fibrosis.
N. S. Rajaram, 76, Indian historian.
Henry Ssentongo, 83, Ugandan Roman Catholic prelate, Bishop of Moroto (1992–2014).
Hannah Steinberg, 93, Austrian-born British psychopharmacologist.
Albert Toro, Papua New Guinean actor, director and politician, member of the Bougainville House of Representatives (since 2018).
Martin Warnke, 82, German art historian, Gottfried Wilhelm Leibniz Prize winner (1990).
Ann Elizabeth Wee, 93, British-born Singaporean social worker.
Ian Young, 76, Scottish footballer (Celtic, St Mirren).

12
Danny Aiello, 86, American actor (Do the Right Thing, The Godfather Part II, Moonstruck).
Dalton Baldwin, 87, American pianist.
Butch Barber, 76, Canadian professional hockey player (Chicago Cougars).
Sir Alasdair Breckenridge, 82, Scottish pharmacologist.
Jorge Hernández, 65, Cuban light flyweight boxer, Olympic champion (1976).
Vaughan Johnson, 57, American football player (Jacksonville Bulls, New Orleans Saints, Philadelphia Eagles), kidney disease.
Norman Kingsbury, 87, New Zealand educational administrator, University of Waikato registrar (1964–1988), New Zealand Qualifications Authority CEO (1990–2000).
David H. Locke, 92, American lawyer and politician, minority leader of the Massachusetts Senate.
Roger Midgley, 95, British field hockey player, Olympic bronze medallist (1952).
Brian Muller, 77, New Zealand rugby union player (Taranaki, national team).
Philip Osondu, 48, Nigerian footballer (R.S.C. Anderlecht).
Steven Ozment, 80, American historian.
Phase 2, 64, American graffiti artist, complications from amyotrophic lateral sclerosis.
Gollapudi Maruti Rao, 80, Indian actor (Samsaram Oka Chadarangam, Yamudiki Mogudu, Aditya 369) and screenwriter.
Željko Rohatinski, 68, Croatian economist.
Jack Scott, 83, Canadian-American rock singer and songwriter ("My True Love", "Burning Bridges").
Gunnar Smoliansky, 86, Swedish photographer.
Sir Peter Snell, 80, New Zealand middle-distance runner, Olympic champion (1960, 1964).
Stig Sollander, 93, Swedish alpine skier, Olympic bronze medalist (1956).
Tatsuo Umemiya, 81, Japanese actor (Abashiri Prison, Battles Without Honor and Humanity, Cops vs. Thugs), kidney failure.

13
Gerd Baltus, 87, German actor (The Blood of the Walsungs, I Am Looking for a Man, Derrick).
Lawrence Bittaker, 79, American serial killer.
Jean-Claude Carle, 71, French politician, Senator (1995–2018).
Graham Cooper, 81, Australian football player (Hawthorn).
Ekaterina Durova, 60, Russian actress (School Waltz, The Admirer, Yuri's Day).
Bram Gay, 89, Welsh trumpeter and brass band musician.
Richard G. Hatcher, 86, American politician, Mayor of Gary, Indiana (1968–1988) and Vice-Chairman of the Democratic National Committee (1981–1985).
Roy Johnston, 90, Irish physicist and political activist.
Roy Loney, 73, American rock singer (Flamin' Groovies). 
Ushiomaru Motoyasu, 41, Japanese rikishi, angiosarcoma.
Wolfgang Nastainczyk, 87, German theologian.
Benur Pashayan, 60, Armenian Greco-Roman wrestler, world champion (1982, 1983).
Emil Richards, 87, American percussionist.
Joey Sandulo, 88, Canadian Olympic boxer (1948).
Carl Scheer, 82, American basketball executive, general manager of the Denver Nuggets (1974–1984) and the Charlotte Hornets (1987–1990).
Rashied Staggie, South African gangster, shot.
Alfons Sweeck, 83, Belgian racing cyclist.
Yasuhiro Takai, 74, Japanese baseball player (Hankyu Braves), renal failure.
Gudrun Zapf-von Hesse, 101, German typographer, calligrapher and book-binder.

14
Yuri Belyayev, 85, Russian footballer (CSKA Moscow, national team), Olympic champion (1956).
Michèle Bernard-Requin, 76, French lawyer and magistrate, cancer.
Chuy Bravo, 63, Mexican-born American actor and television personality (Chelsea Lately, After Lately), heart attack.
John Briley, 94, American screenwriter (Gandhi, Cry Freedom, Marie), Oscar winner (1983).
Dmitri Chesnokov, 46, Russian footballer (FC Saturn Ramenskoye, FC Vityaz Podolsk).
Jack B. Farris, 84, American military officer, commander of ground forces during Operation Urgent Fury.
Warren A. Grady, 95, American politician, member (1953–1961) and majority leader (1957) of the Wisconsin State Assembly.
André Gaumond, 83, Canadian Roman Catholic prelate, Archbishop of Sherbrooke (1996–2011).
Lord Tim Hudson, 79, English DJ, voice actor (The Jungle Book), and agent (Ian Botham).
Michael Karkoc, 100, Ukrainian military officer.
Anna Karina, 79, Danish-born French actress (My Life to Live, A Woman Is a Woman, Alphaville), cancer.
A. K. M. Sirazul Islam Khan, 76, Bangladeshi academic, vice-chancellor of Jagannath University (2006–2008).
Koo Cha-kyung, 94, South Korean business executive, chairman of LG Group (1970–1995).
Stuart J. Knickerbocker, 94, American cartoonist and animator.
Bernard Lavalette, 93, French actor (Thomas the Impostor, Le gendarme se marie, The Apprentice Heel).
Meng Zhizhong, 84, Chinese satellite engineer, chief designer of the Fengyun-1 and -3.
Moondog Rex, 69, American professional wrestler (WWF).
Panamarenko, 79, Belgian sculptor.
Pamela Payton-Wright, 78, American actress.
Billie Rattigan, 87, Irish Gaelic footballer (Dunshaughlin, Meath).
Felix Rohatyn, 91, Austrian-born American banker and diplomat, Ambassador to France (1997–2000).
Gita Siddharth, Indian actress (Parichay, Garm Hava).
Jerome L. Singer, 95, American psychologist.
Vladimir Tsyplakov, 50, Belarusian ice hockey player (Los Angeles Kings, Buffalo Sabres).
Irv Williams, 100, American jazz saxophonist.
Doug Woog, 75, American ice hockey coach (Minnesota Golden Gophers).
Barbara Wright, 84, Irish academic and translator.
Ken Wright, 94, Australian politician, member of the Victorian Legislative Council (1973–1992).

15
Ron Areshenkoff, 62, Canadian hockey player (Edmonton Oilers) and coach.
Jean de Viguerie, 84, French historian.
Alfred Dennis, 95, Australian politician, MLA (1959–1962).
Alan Doble, 76, Australian cricketer (Victoria).
Tommy Forgan, 90, English footballer (York City).
Yuan-Cheng Fung, 100, Chinese-born American bioengineer.
Wense Grabarek, 100, American politician, Mayor of Durham, North Carolina (1963–1971).
Nicky Henson, 74, English actor (EastEnders, Syriana, Shine on Harvey Moon), cancer.
Neil Peter Jampolis, 76, American stage director.
Rex Johnston, 82, American baseball and football player (Pittsburgh Pirates, Pittsburgh Steelers), heart failure.
Dudley Kernick, 98, English footballer (Torquay United) and commercial manager (Stoke City).
Rajesh Khaitan, 75, Indian politician, MLA (1982–2001).
Robert Kinkead, 67, American chef.
David Lambie, 94, British politician, MP (1970–1992).
Sonja Landweer, 86, Dutch artist.
Monique Leyrac, 91, Canadian singer and actress.
Sir Thomas Pearson, 105, British army general.
Chuck Peddle, 82, American electrical engineer, designer of MOS Technology 6502, KIM-1 and Commodore PET, pancreatic cancer.
Morgan Porteus, 102, American clergyman of the Episcopal Church, Bishop of Connecticut (1977–1981).
I. D. Swami, 90, Indian politician.
Tian Bo, 87, Chinese virologist.
Andrew Woodhouse, 96, British Anglican priest, Archdeacon of Ludlow (1970–1982) and Hereford (1982–1991).

16
Stephen F. Barker, 92, American philosopher.
Basil Butcher, 86, Guyanese cricketer (national team, West Indies).
George Ferguson, 67, Canadian ice hockey player (Toronto Maple Leafs, Pittsburgh Penguins).
Bentley Kassal, 102, American attorney, member of the New York State Assembly (1957–1962).
Sir Hans Kornberg, 91, German-born British-American biochemist.
Jürgen Kühling, 85, German jurist, judge of the Federal Constitutional Court (1989–2001).
Peter Larkin, 93, American stage designer, four-time Tony winner.
Bernard Lefèvre, 89, French Olympic footballer (1952).
Bertrand Lemennicier, 76, French economist.
Sukhendu Maity, 92, Indian politician, MLA (1987–1991).
Mama Cax, 30, Haitian-American model, cancer.
Pál Romány, 90, Hungarian agrarian engineer, politician, Minister of Agriculture and Food (1975–1980).
Rich Rundles, 38, American baseball player (Cleveland Indians).
Bill Simpson, 79, American racing driver and businessman (Simpson Performance Products), stroke.
Sevim Tekeli, 94, Turkish historian of science.
Rob Tillard, 95, English cricketer and army officer.
T. Torechu, 71, Indian politician, MLA (since 2003).
Averil Williams, 84, British Olympic athlete (1960).

17
Karin Balzer, 81, German hurdler, Olympic champion (1964).
Zafar Chaudhry, 93, Pakistani air marshal, airline executive and human rights activist, Chief of Air Staff (1972–1974), cardiac arrest.
Da Chen, 57, Chinese-born American novelist, lung cancer.
Enzio d'Antonio, 94, Italian Roman Catholic prelate, Archbishop of Lanciano-Ortona (1982–2000).
Hayden Fry, 90, American Hall of Fame college football player (Baylor Bears) and coach (Iowa Hawkeyes), cancer.
Jacques Grimbert, 90, French conductor.
Connie Hartnett, 68, Irish football player (Cork GAA).
Malcolm Heath, 89, English cricketer.
Ron Hogg, 68, British police officer, Durham Police and Crime Commissioner (since 2012), amyotrophic lateral sclerosis.
Bronco Horvath, 89, Canadian ice hockey player (Boston Bruins, New York Rangers, Chicago Blackhawks).
Cuchlaine King, 97, British geomorphologist.
Scot Kleinendorst, 59, American ice hockey player (New York Rangers, Hartford Whalers), workplace accident.
Shriram Lagoo, 92, Indian actor (Gharaonda, Thodisi Bewafaii, Maqsad).
Cândido Lorenzo González, 94, Spanish-born Brazilian Roman Catholic prelate, Bishop of São Raimundo Nonato (1969–2002).
Kaushalendra Pratap Shahi, 103, Indian politician, MLA (1967–1969).
Tom White, 80, Scottish footballer (Bury, Crystal Palace).
Peter Wollen, 81, British film theorist and filmmaker.

18
Al Adinolfi, 85, American politician, member of the Connecticut House of Representatives (1999–2001, 2003–2009, 2011–2017).
Patxi Andión, 72, Spanish singer-songwriter, musician and actor (The Compass Rose), traffic collision.
Claudine Auger, 78, French actress (Thunderball, Le Masque de fer) and model (Miss France Monde, 1958).
Alain Barrière, 84, French singer ("Elle était si jolie").
Tunç Başaran, 81, Turkish film director (Ayşecik ve Sihirli Cüceler Rüyalar Ülkesinde, Don't Let Them Shoot the Kite, Piano Piano Kid) and screenwriter.
Herman Boone, 84, American football coach (T. C. Williams High School), subject of Remember the Titans.
Jacques Bravo, 75, French politician, Councillor of Paris (1995–2014).
Sylvia Chant, 60, British geographer.
Geulah Cohen, 93, Israeli politician, member of Knesset (1974–1992) and founder of Tehiya, Israel Prize recipient (2003).
Mary Cosh, 100, British freelance journalist and local historian.
Leandro Despouy, 72, Argentine human rights lawyer, President of United Nations Commission on Human Rights (2001–2002).
Ibrahim Diarra, 36, French rugby union player (Castres Olympique), heart attack.
Marron Curtis Fort, 81, American-born German linguist.
Abdullah Khodabandeh, 83, Iranian Olympic wrestler (1964).
Kenny Lynch, 81, English singer ("You Can Never Stop Me Loving You"), actor (Carry On Loving, The Playbirds) and entertainer.
Arty McGlynn, 75, Irish guitarist (Patrick Street).
Doug Ricketson, 89, Australian rugby league player (Sydney Roosters).
Jagdev Singh Rai, 50, Indian Olympic hockey player (1992).
Abbey Simon, 99, American classical pianist.
Benjamin Uwajumogu, 51, Nigerian politician.

19
Ricardo de Aparici, 79, Argentine lawyer and politician, Governor of Jujuy Province (1987–1990).
Francisco Brennand, 92, Brazilian sculptor.
Neil Cameron, 81, Canadian politician, academic and journalist, MNA (1989–1994).
Jules Deelder, 75, Dutch poet.
Jan de Laval, 71, Swedish actor.
Sir Alex Jarratt, 95, British businessman and civil servant.
Ward Just, 84, American journalist and author, Lewy body dementia.
Saoul Mamby, 72, American boxer, WBC super lightweight champion (1980–1982).
Brian Mayes, 85, British army officer, Director General Army Medical Services (1993–1996).
George Metallinos, 79, Greek priest, theologian and author.
Yoshio Mochizuki, 72, Japanese politician, MP (1996–2009, since 2011).
José Miguel Oviedo, 85, Peruvian writer and literary critic.
Dale Russell, 81, Canadian palaeontologist.
Stanley J. Stein, 99, American historian.
Arthur Verow, 77, American politician, member of the Maine House of Representatives (2013–2017, since 2019), heart attack.
Shahdon Winchester, 27, Trinidadian footballer (W Connection, FF Jaro, national team), traffic collision.
Alba Zaluar, 77, Brazilian anthropologist.

20
Sir Fazle Hasan Abed, 83, Bangladeshi philanthropist, founder of BRAC, complications from a brain tumour.
Matti Ahde, 73, Finnish politician, MP (1970–1990, 2003–2011), pancreatic cancer.
Zilda Cardoso, 83, Brazilian actress.
Thomas Chandy, 72, Indian politician, MLA (since 2006).
Robert Creech, 91, Canadian horn player and arts administrator.
Frank Foster, 79, English rugby league player and coach.
Hermann L. Gremliza, 79, German journalist.
Billy Hughes, 70, Scottish footballer (Sunderland, Leicester City, national team).
John Irwin, 79, American poet and literary critic.
Junior Johnson, 88, American Hall of Fame racing driver (NASCAR Cup Series) and team owner (Junior Johnson & Associates).
Ambrose Kiapseni, 74, Papua New Guinean Roman Catholic prelate, Bishop of Kavieng (1991–2018).
Eduard Krieger, 73, Austrian footballer (Austria Wien, LASK, national team).
Klaus Uwe Ludwig, 76, German church music director and concert organist.
Bashir Maan, 93, Pakistani-British politician.
Roland Matthes, 69, German Hall of Fame swimmer, multiple world record holder, Olympic (1968, 1972) and world (1973, 1975) champion.
Robert Moir, 58, Australian medical researcher, glioblastoma.
Denis Norman, 89, British-born Zimbabwean politician, Minister of Agriculture (1980–1985) and Transport (1990–1997).
Marko Orlandić, 89, Montenegrin politician, Prime Minister (1974–1978) and President (1983–1984).
Yuri Pshenichnikov, 79, Soviet-born Russian football player (Pakthakor Tashkent, CSKA Moscow, USSR national team) and manager.
Daniel Selvaraj, 81, Indian novelist.
L. S. Sheshagiri Rao, 94, Indian writer and academic.
Bruce M. Snell Jr., 90, American judge, Justice of the Iowa Supreme Court (1987–2001).
Woody Vasulka, 82, American filmmaker and pioneer of video art.

21
Gerry Alanguilan, 51, Filipino comic book artist and writer (Wasted, Elmer, X-Men).
Jimmy Allen, 67, American football player (Detroit Lions, Pittsburgh Steelers).
Norm Angelini, 72, American baseball player (Kansas City Royals).
Stefan Angelov, 72, Bulgarian wrestler, Olympic bronze medalist (1972, 1976).
Ali Argon, 89, Turkish-born American engineer.
François Autain, 84, French politician, Senator (1983–2011).
Ramachandra Babu, 72, Indian cinematographer (Dweepu, Chamaram, Oru Vadakkan Veeragatha), heart attack.
Peter Bartlett, 90, New Zealand architect and academic (University of Auckland).
Ronald Bowlby, 93, British Anglican clergyman, Bishop of Southwark (1980–1991).
Leslie Brent, 94, British immunologist and zoologist.
Deng Hongxun, 88, Chinese politician and engineer, Communist Party Secretary of Hainan (1990–1993).
Gerald A. Feltham, 81, Canadian accounting researcher.
Roger Goossens, 93, Belgian Olympic hockey player (1948, 1952, 1956, 1960).
William Higgins, 74, American gay pornographic film director (Big Guns), heart attack.
Louis Jenkins, 77, American poet.
Frankie Kennedy, 78, Irish Gaelic footballer (Drumlane).
Isaac Kramnick, 81, American historian.
Li Rongrong, 75, Chinese politician, Chairman of the State-owned Assets Supervision and Administration Commission (2003–2010).
Lin Zonghu, 86, Chinese thermal engineer, member of the Chinese Academy of Engineering.
G. Nanjundan, 58, Indian writer. (death announced on this date)
Andrew Clennel Palmer, 81, British engineer, Fellow of the Royal Society (1994)
Ron Penny, 82, Polish-born Australian immunologist.
Martin Peters, 76, English football player (West Ham United, Norwich City, national team) and manager, World Cup winner (1966).
Lidio Rainaldi, 90, American politician, member of the New Mexico Senate (2001–2008).
Joseph Segel, 88, American direct marketer (QVC, Advertising Specialty Institute, The Franklin Mint).
Muhammad Shahrur, 81, Syrian Islamic scholar.
Bolotbek Shamshiyev, 78, Kyrgyz film director (The White Ship).
Banwari Lal Sharma, 61, Indian politician, MLA (since 2018), cancer.
Sam Strahan, 74, New Zealand rugby union player (Manawatu, national team).
Emanuel Ungaro, 86, French fashion designer.
Krisztián Zahorecz, 44, Hungarian footballer (Kaposvári Rákóczi, Szolnoki MÁV, Bajai LSE).

22
Georget Bertoncello, 76, Belgian footballer (Sporting Charleroi, Liège, Olympic Charleroi).
Thor Bjarne Bore, 81, Norwegian newspaper editor and politician, Chair of Norwegian Church Aid (since 2000).
Tony Britton, 95, British actor (Operation Amsterdam, Sunday Bloody Sunday, The Day of the Jackal).
Myrtle Cagle, 94, American pilot, member of Mercury 13.
Mahmudul Amin Choudhury, 82, Bangladeshi judge, Chief Justice (2001–2002).
Pier Giorgio Di Cicco, 70, Italian-born Canadian poet, heart attack.
Sidney Holt, 93, British marine biologist.
Greg Kirk, 56, American politician, member of the Georgia State Senate (since 2014), bile duct cancer.
Fritz Künzli, 73, Swiss footballer (national team).
Bill Lambert, 89, New Zealand politician, MP for Western Hutt (1975–1978).
Ronald Melzack, 90, Canadian psychologist, founding editor of Textbook of Pain.
Karl E. Meyer, 91, American journalist.
Mohammad Ebadot Hossain Mondal, 80, Bangladeshi politician, MP (1979–1982).
Maurizio Noci, 82, Italian politician, MP (1979–1983, 1985–1992).
Ubirajara Penacho dos Reis, 85, Brazilian musician (Programa do Jô), stroke.
Ram Dass, 88, American spiritual teacher, psychologist and author (Be Here Now).
Édison Realpe, 23, Ecuadorian footballer (Guayaquil City, L.D.U. Quito), traffic collision.
Billy Slade, 78, Welsh cricketer (Glamorgan).
Elizabeth Spencer, 98, American novelist (The Light in the Piazza).
Gary Talbot, 82, English footballer (Chester, Crewe Alexandra, Drumcondra), lung cancer.

23
Jean Blot, 96, Russian-born French writer and translator.
John Cain, 88, Australian politician, Premier of Victoria (1982–1990), stroke.
Carl R. Deckard, 58, American inventor (SLS).
David Foster, 90, American film producer (The Thing, Short Circuit, The Getaway).
Jamie Lee Hamilton, 64, Canadian politician and sex worker advocate.
Alan Harrington, 86, Welsh footballer (Cardiff City, national team).
Elmer Beseler Harris, 80, American businessman (Alabama Power) and political strategist.
Duncan MacKay, 82, Scottish footballer (Celtic, Perth, national team).
Brian McGuinness, 92, British philosopher.
Mr. Niebla, 46, Mexican professional wrestler (CMLL), blood infection.
Mustafa Mujezinović, 64, Bosnian politician, Prime Minister of the Federation of Bosnia and Herzegovina (2009–2011).
George Petchey, 88, English football player (Queens Park Rangers, Crystal Palace) and manager (Leyton Orient).
Wanda Pimentel, 76, Brazilian painter.
Fred B. Rooney, 94, American politician, member of the U.S. House of Representatives (1963–1979) and Pennsylvania State Senate (1958–1963).
Charles Rubia, 96, Kenyan politician, MP (1969–1988) and Mayor of Nairobi (1963–1967).
Ahmed Gaid Salah, 79, Algerian military officer, Chief of Staff of the People's National Army (since 2004), heart attack.
John Simonian, 84, Kenyan Olympic hockey player, (1960, 1964, 1968).
Georgeta Snegur, 82, Romanian-born Moldovan socialite, First Lady (1990–1997).
Ulla Trenter, 83, Swedish author.
Ganga Prasad Vimal, 80, Indian writer, traffic collision.
Bob Wade, 76, American sculptor and artist, heart failure.

24
Giacomo Bazzan, 69, Italian Olympic cyclist (1972).
Fred Emmer, 85, Dutch news anchor (NOS Journaal).
Kelly Fraser, 26, Canadian Inuktitut pop singer and songwriter, suicide.
Rusty Hilger, 57, American football player (Los Angeles Raiders, Detroit Lions, Seattle Seahawks), cancer. 
David Hogness, 94, American scientist.
Walter Horak, 88, Austrian footballer (Wiener Sport Club, Sochaux, national team).
Prasanna Jayawardena, 63, Sri Lankan judge, Justice of the Supreme Court (since 2016).
Sergei Karimov, 33, Kazakh footballer (Wolfsburg, MSV Duisburg, national team).
Andrew Miller, 70, British politician, MP (1992–2015).
Dave Riley, 59, American bassist (Big Black), throat cancer.
Werner Franz Siebenbrock, 82, German Roman Catholic prelate, Bishop of Governador Valadares (2001–2014).
Noor-Ali Tabandeh, 92, Iranian Islamic Sufi leader, Qutb of the Ni'matullāhī.
Allee Willis, 72, American Hall of Fame songwriter ("I'll Be There for You", "September") and lyricist (The Color Purple), cardiac arrest.

25
Patricia Alice Albrecht, 66, American actress (Jem,  The New Yogi Bear Show, Midnight Madness) and writer.
Dario Antoniozzi, 96, Italian politician, MP (1953–1980), Secretary of the Council of Ministers (1970–1972) and MEP (1979–1989).
Ari Behn, 47, Norwegian author, member of the royal family (2002–2017), suicide.
Vladimir Bushin, 95, Russian writer and literary critic.
Neville Buswell, 76, British actor (Coronation Street).
Sultana Rezwan Chowdhury, 71, Bangladeshi politician, MP (1986–1988).
Ethella Chupryk, 55, Ukrainian pianist.
John Davidson, 93, British chemical engineer. 
Táňa Fischerová, 72, Czech actress (Hotel for Strangers), civic activist and politician, MP (2002–2006).
Makhmut Gareev, 96, Russian military officer, Deputy Chief of the Soviet General Staff (1984–1992).
Eliot Glassheim, 81, American politician, member of the North Dakota House of Representatives (1993–2017).
William Greider, 83, American economics journalist (The Washington Post, The Nation, Rolling Stone), complications from heart failure.
Andy Hassler, 68, American baseball player (California Angels, Kansas City Royals, New York Mets).
Stephen Kasner, 49, American artist.
Martyn King, 82, English footballer (Colchester United, Wrexham).
Desmond King-Hele, 92, British scientist, poet and author.
Johnny Matthews, 73, English football player (Waterford, Limerick) and manager (Newcastlewest).
Lee Mendelson, 86, American television producer (Peanuts), lung cancer.
Yiannis Papadimitriou, 107, Greek lawyer, pro-democracy activist and politician, MP (1956–1967).
William B. Pratt, 84, American politician, member of the New Mexico House of Representatives (since 2018), complications from a stroke.
Niju Ram, Indian politician, MLA (1977–1982).
Peter Schreier, 84, German operatic tenor and conductor.
Chuck Turner, 79, American politician and activist, member of the Boston City Council (1999–2010).
Albano Vicariotto, 88, Italian footballer (Milan, Palermo, Pro Patria).

26
Badeti Bujji, 55, Indian politician, MLA (2014–2019), heart attack.
Jocelyn Burdick, 97, American politician, U.S. Senator (1992).
Les Chadwick, 76, English bass player (Gerry and the Pacemakers), brain cancer.
Hans-Jörg Criens, 59, German footballer (Borussia Mönchengladbach, Nürnberg).
Roger De Wilde, 79, Belgian Olympic water polo player (1960, 1964).
Elbert Dubenion, 86, American football player (Buffalo Bills).
Nicolas Estgen, 89, Luxembourgish politician, MEP (1979–1994).
Arjan Hasid, 89, Indian poet.
Jerry Herman, 88, American composer (Hello, Dolly!, Mame, La Cage aux Folles) and lyricist, pulmonary disease.
Sleepy LaBeef, 84, American rockabilly singer.
Sue Lyon, 73, American actress (Lolita, The Night of the Iguana, 7 Women).
Nguyễn Văn Tý, 94, Vietnamese composer.
Eigil Nielsen, 71, Danish footballer (Winterthur, Basel, national team).
Kushal Punjabi, 42, Indian actor (Ishq Mein Marjawan, Kaal) and reality television contestant (Zor Ka Jhatka: Total Wipeout), suicide by hanging.
Gary Starkweather, 81, American engineer and inventor (laser printer), leukemia.
Galina Volchek, 86, Russian actress (Don Quixote, Beware of the Car, Autumn Marathon) and film director, People's Artist of the USSR (1989), pneumonia.

27
Quentin V. Anderson, 87, American politician.
Dick Bokelmann, 93, American baseball player (St. Louis Cardinals).
Ulysses Currie, 84, American politician, member of the Maryland House of Delegates (1987–1995) and Senate (1995–2019).
Romà Cuyàs i Sol, 81, Spanish Olympic sports commissioner, president of the Spanish Olympic Committee (1983–1984) and the National Sports Council (1982–1987).
Sachhidanand Narayan Deb, 98, Indian politician, MLA (1971–1977).
Takehiko Endo, 81, Japanese politician, MP (1986–1993, 1996–2009) and Minister of Agriculture, Forestry and Fisheries (2007), pneumonia.
Don Imus, 79, American radio personality (Imus in the Morning), complications from lung disease.
Phillip Carl Jablonski, 73, American serial killer.
J. Charles Jones, 82, American civil rights activist, co-founder of the Student Nonviolent Coordinating Committee.
Bernard Lavigne, 65, French rugby union player (Agen, national team).
Garrett List, 76, American trombonist, vocalist and composer.
Neal Peirce, 87, American columnist and author on urban affairs, glioblastoma.
Remilia, 24, American professional video game player (League of Legends Championship Series).
Ilias Rosidis, 92, Greek footballer (Olympiacos, national team).
John Rothchild, 74, American writer.
Eunus Ali Sarkar, 66, Bangladeshi politician, MP (since 2014), lung cancer.
Jack Sheldon, 88, American trumpeter (The Merv Griffin Show), singer ("I'm Just a Bill") and voice actor (Schoolhouse Rock!).
Jasbir Singh, 78, Indian politician, MLA (1992–1997), heart attack.
Wolfgang Sühnholz, 73, German-born American footballer and coach.
Art Sullivan, 69, Belgian singer, pancreatic cancer.
Ann Spokes Symonds, 94, English author and politician, Mayor of Oxford (1976).
Fabien Thiémé, 67, French politician, Mayor of Marly (since 2008), Deputy (1988–1993).

28
Robert Baden-Powell, 3rd Baron Baden-Powell, 83, British scouting leader.
Indramoni Bora, 81, Indian politician, MP (1991–2007).
Mirko Crepaldi, 47, Italian racing cyclist, heart attack.
John Christopher Dancy, 99, British headmaster (Lancing College, Marlborough College).
Dieter Danzberg, 79, German footballer (Bayern Munich, Rot-Weiß Oberhausen, Freiburger FC).
Vilhjálmur Einarsson, 85, Icelandic athlete, Olympic silver medallist (1956).
Nilcéa Freire, 66, Brazilian academic and politician, President of the Inter-American Commission of Women (2005–2007), cancer.
Fred Graham, 88, American legal correspondent (CBS News) and television anchor (Court TV), Peabody Award winner (1974), Parkinson's disease.
Richard M. Ivey, 94, Canadian lawyer and philanthropist.
Carley Ann McCord, 30, American sports reporter (WDSU, Cox Sports Television), plane crash.
Thanos Mikroutsikos, 72, Greek composer and politician, Minister of Culture (1994–1996).
Amy Patterson, 107, Argentine composer, singer and poet.
Anthony Ribustello, 53, American actor (The Sopranos, Be Cool, Uptown Girls).
Fred Richmond, 96, American politician, member of the U.S. House of Representatives (1975–1982), pneumonia.
Izzy Slapawitz, 71, American professional wrestler, manager and commentator (ICW), complications during surgery.
Erzsébet Szőnyi, 95, Hungarian composer and music pedagogue, vice-president of the International Society for Music Education (1970–1974).
Michael Trikilis, 79, American film and television producer (Playboy TV).

29
Dina Birte Al-Erhayem, 44, Danish actress, suicide.
LaDell Andersen, 90, American basketball coach (Utah State Aggies, Utah Stars, BYU Cougars).
Abu Raihan Biswas, 79, Indian politician, MLA (1972–1977).
Valentin Bogomazov, 76, Russian diplomat, ambassador to Peru (1997–2001) and Ecuador (2004–2008).
Carla Calò, 93, Italian actress (Totò Le Mokò, Captain Falcon, One Thousand Dollars on the Black).
Radhakrishnan Dhanarajan, 39, Indian footballer (Mohammedan, East Bengal), heart attack.
Sebastián Ferrat, 41, Mexican actor (Amar de nuevo, El Señor de los Cielos, El Vato), complications from food poisoning.
Alasdair Gray, 85, Scottish visual artist and author (Lanark).
Neil Innes, 75, English comedian (Monty Python), musician (The Rutles, Bonzo Dog Doo-Dah Band) and writer, heart attack.
Paul X. Kelley, 91, American general, Commandant of the Marine Corps (1983–1987).
Talukder Moniruzzaman, 81, Bangladeshi political scientist.
Fred Mukisa, 70, Ugandan educator and politician, MP (2006–2011), cancer.
Vaughan Oliver, 62, British graphic designer (4AD).
Giovanni Paliaga, 88, Italian Olympic swimmer, (1952).
M. C. Ricklefs, 76, Australian orientalist.
John Shuker, 77, British footballer (Oxford United).
Sheesharam Singh, 74, Indian politician, MLA (2007–2012).
Oluf Skarpnes, 87, Norwegian jurist.
Manfred Stolpe, 83, German politician, Minister of Transport (2002–2005), liver cancer.
Ken Strongman, 79, British-born New Zealand psychologist and academic.
Norma Tanega, 80, American musician, singer-songwriter and artist, cancer.
Harry Villegas, 79, Cuban Communist guerrilla and writer.
Vishwesha Tirtha, 88, Indian Dvaita Vedanta spiritual leader, Seer of Pejawara Matha (since 1952), pneumonia.
Neal Watlington, 97, American baseball player (Philadelphia Athletics).
Anthony Wilden, 84, British academic.
Zhang Jiaxiang, 87, Chinese astronomer.

30
Syed Muazzem Ali, 75, Bangladeshi diplomat.
Beatriz Alfonso Nogue, 51, Spanish chess player.
Piara Singh Bhaniara, 61, Indian Dalit religious leader, co-author of Bhavsagar Granth.
Valentin Bliznyuk, 91, Russian aircraft designer, Tupolev design bureau (Tupolev Tu-160).
Micky Block, 79, English football player (Chelsea F.C.).
Marion Chesney, 83, Scottish novelist (Death of a Gossip, Death of an Outsider, Agatha Raisin and the Deadly Dance).
Marie Devereux, 79, English actress. 
Dragomir Draganov, 71, Bulgarian historian and politician, MP (1997–2001).
Antônio Dumas, 64, Brazilian football player (Santos) and manager (Togo national team, Equatorial Guinea national team).
Jan Fedder, 64, German actor (Großstadtrevier, Das Boot, Soul Kitchen), cancer.
Jack Garfein, 89, Czechoslovak-born American film producer and director (The Strange One, Something Wild), co-founder of the Hollywood Theatre Row.
Prosper Grech, 94, Maltese Roman Catholic cardinal, co-founder of the Patristic Institute Augustinianum.
Gertrude Himmelfarb, 97, American historian.
Vibeke Klint, 92, Danish textile artist.
Harry Kupfer, 84, German opera director.
Horst Kwech, 82, Austrian-born Australian racecar driver.
Slaheddine Maaoui, 69, Tunisian journalist and politician, Minister of  Tourism (1995–2001), heart attack.
Damiri Mahmud, 74, Indonesian writer.
Giovanni Innocenzo Martinelli, 77, Libyan-Italian Roman Catholic prelate, Apostolic Vicar of Tripoli (1985–2017).
Syd Mead, 86, American concept artist (Blade Runner, Aliens, Tron), lymphoma.
Sonny Mehta, 77, Indian-British-American publishing executive (Knopf Doubleday Publishing Group).
José Manuel Moreiras, 43, Argentine footballer (Rosario Central, Brasilia, Sport Huancayo), shot.
Carl-Heinz Rühl, 80, German football player (MSV Duisburg, 1. FC Köln) and manager (Borussia Dortmund).
Elizabeth Sellars, 98, Scottish actress (The Barefoot Contessa, 55 Days at Peking, The Webster Boy).
André Smets, 76, Belgian politician, Mayor of Herve (1985–2010).
Nils Petter Sundgren, 90, Swedish film critic and television presenter (Filmkrönikan).
Gennadiy Valyukevich, 61, Belarusian triple jumper, European indoor champion (1979).
Johnny Ward, 78, English rugby league footballer (Castleford, England, Great Britain) 
Charles Williams, Baron Williams of Elvel, 86, British business executive and cricketer, member of the House of Lords (1985–2019).
Vikho-o Yhoshü, 67, Indian politician, MLA (since 2013), lung cancer.

31
Serikbolsyn Abdildin, 82, Kazakh economist and politician, Chairman of the Supreme Council (1991–1993).
Peeter Allik, 53, Estonian surrealist painter.
Daniel P. Biebuyck, 94, Belgian art historian.
Rene Daalder, 75, Dutch writer and director.
Djimrangar Dadnadji, 65, Chadian politician, Prime Minister (2013), stroke.
Pierre Galet, 98, French ampelographer and author.
Muhammadu Gawo, 65, Nigerian politician, member of the Jigawa State House of Assembly (since 2015).
Chucrallah Harb, 96, Lebanese Maronite hierarch, Bishop of Baalbek (1967–1977) and Jounieh (1977–1999).
Ratko Janev, 80, Macedonian atomic physicist.
Ernie Jones, 87, Irish golfer.
Vic Juris, 66, American jazz guitarist, liver cancer.
J. L. Lewis, 59, American golfer, multiple myeloma.
Janet Lowe, 79, American biographer and financial journalist, ovarian cancer.
Guðrún Ögmundsdóttir, 69, Icelandic politician, cancer.
Shahla Riahi, 92, Iranian actress and film director (Marjan).
Shyqyri Rreli, 89, Albanian football player (Puna Tirana, Dinamo Tirana) and manager  (national team).
Eva Sørensen, 79, Danish sculptor.
A. V. Swamy, 90, Indian politician, MP (2012–2018).
Ivo-Valentino Tomaš, 26, Croatian footballer (Dugopolje, Oldenburg, SSV Jeddeloh), suicide by hanging.
Basil Watts, 93, English rugby league player (York Wasps, England national team, Great Britain national team), world champion (1954).
Martin West, 82, American actor (Assault on Precinct 13, Freckles, As the World Turns).

References

2019-12
 12